Hanila is a village in Lääneranna Parish, Pärnu County in western Estonia.
The village is home to Hanila museum and Hanila church.

References

 

Villages in Pärnu County
Kreis Wiek